The 1953–54 Michigan Wolverines men's basketball team represented the University of Michigan in intercollegiate basketball during the 1953–54 season.  The team finished the season with an overall record of 9–13 and 3–11 against Big Ten Conference opponents.

William Perigo was in his second year as the team's head coach.  Jim Barron was the team's leading scorer with 377 points in 22 games for an average of 17.1 points per game.  Ray Pavichevich was the team captain.

Statistical leaders

References

Michigan
Michigan Wolverines men's basketball seasons
Michigan Wolverines basketball
Michigan Wolverines basketball